Hibiscadelphus giffardianus (Kilauea hau kuahiwi) is a species of flowering plant in the mallow family, Malvaceae, that is endemic to the Big Island of Hawaii. It is believed to be extinct in the wild; any remaining plants are threatened by habitat loss. Cultivated plants exist in Hawaii Volcanoes National Park.

References

giffardianus
Endemic flora of Hawaii
Biota of Hawaii (island)
Trees of Hawaii
Plants described in 1911
Plants extinct in the wild
Taxonomy articles created by Polbot